The 2021–22 Ball State Cardinals men's basketball team represented Ball State University in the 2021–22 NCAA Division I men's basketball season. The Cardinals, led by ninth-year head coach James Whitford, played their home games at Worthen Arena in Muncie, IN as members of the Mid-American Conference. They finished the season 14–17, 9–10 in MAC play to finish in sixth place. They lost to Ohio in the quarterfinals of the MAC tournament.

On March 14, 2022, the school fired head coach James Whitford. On March 25, UCLA assistant coach Michael Lewis was named the team's new head coach.

Previous season
In a season limited due to the ongoing COVID-19 pandemic, the Cardinals finished the 2020–21 season 7–11, 5–8 in MAC play to finish in a tie for eighth place. The Cardinals lost to Toledo in the quarterfinals of the MAC tournament.

Offseason

Departures

Incoming transfers

Recruiting class

Roster

Schedule and results

|-
!colspan=12 style=| Exhibition

|-
!colspan=9 style=| Non-conference regular season

|-
!colspan=9 style=| MAC regular season

|-
!colspan=9 style=| MAC tournament

Source

References

Ball State Cardinals men's basketball seasons
Ball State Cardinals
Ball State Cardinals men's basketball
Ball State Cardinals men's basketball